Iglesia de Santa Bárbara (Llaranes) is a church in Llaranes, Avilés, Asturias, Spain. The church contains notable mosaics and stained glass windows by Eugenio Francisco Javier Clavo Gil

See also
Asturian art
Catholic Church in Spain
Churches in Asturias
List of oldest church buildings

References

Churches in Asturias